John Emery (May 20, 1905 – November 16, 1964) was an American actor.

Early years
Born in New York City, Emery was the son of stage actors Edward Emery (c. 1861 – 1938) and Isabel Waldron (1871–1950). He was educated at Long Island's La Salle Military Academy.

Film
Through the late 1930s to the early 1960s Emery appeared in supporting roles in many Hollywood films, beginning with James Whale's The Road Back (1937) and ranging from Alfred Hitchcock's Spellbound to Rocketship X-M.

Stage

Emery appeared on Broadway in John Brown (1934), Romeo and Juliet (1934-1935), The Barretts of Wimpole Street (1935), Flowers of the Forest (1935), Parnell (1935-1936), Alice Takat (1936), Sweet Aloes (1936), Hamlet (1936-1937), Antony and Cleopatra (1937), Save Me the Waltz (1938), The Unconquered (1940), Liliom (1940), Retreat to Pleasure (1940-1941), Angel Street (1941-1944), Peepshow (1944), The Relapse (1950), The Royal Family (1951), The Constant Wife (1951-1952), Anastasia (1954-1955), Hotel Paradiso (1957), and Rape of the Belt (1960).

Peepshow was the first production in which Emery and his third wife, Tamara Geva, appeared together.

Television and radio
Emery was also known for his television work, appearing on programs like I Love Lucy and Have Gun Will Travel.  In 1946 he starred in a radio program as detective Philo Vance.

Personal life
Emery married Patricia Calvert in 1926, ending in divorce in 1929. He  married Tallulah Bankhead on August 31, 1937, in Jasper, Alabama (her only marriage), divorcing on June 13, 1941, in Reno, Nevada. The two remained friendly after their marriage. In 1942, Emery married dancer Tamara Geva, divorcing in 1963. Emery had started a long-term relationship with actress Joan Bennett in 1961, who cared for him through his final illness and death in 1964.

Due to their resemblance, Emery often was rumoured to be the illegitimate child of John Barrymore. As a child, Emery roomed for a while with Barrymore and his first wife, Katherine Corri.

Death
Emery died on November 16, 1964, in New York City, aged 59.

Selected filmography

 The Road Back (1937) - Captain Von Hagen
 Here Comes Mr. Jordan (1941) - Tony Abbott
 The Corsican Brothers (1941) - Tomasso
 Two Yanks in Trinidad (1942) - Chicago Hagen
 Ship Ahoy (1942) - Dr. Farno
 Eyes in the Night (1942) - Paul Gerente
 George Washington Slept Here (1942) - Clayton Evans
 Assignment in Brittany (1943) - Capt. Deichgraber
 Mademoiselle Fifi (1944) - Jean Cornudet
 Blood on the Sun (1945) - Premier Giichi Tanaka
 The Spanish Main (1945) - Capt. Mario Du Billar
 Spellbound (1945) - Dr. Fleurot
 The Voice of the Turtle (1947) - George Harrington
 Let's Live Again (1948) - Larry Blake
 The Woman in White (1948) - Sir Percival Glyde
 The Gay Intruders (1948) - John Newberry
 Joan of Arc (1948) - Jean, Duke d'Alençon, cousin of Charles VII
 Dakota Lil (1950) - Vincent
 Rocketship X-M (1950) - Dr. Karl Eckstrom
 Frenchie (1950) - Clyde Gorman
 Double Crossbones (1951) - Gov. Elden
 Joe Palooka in Triple Cross (1951) - 'Professor'
 The Mad Magician (1954) - The Great Rinaldi
 A Lawless Street (1955) - Cody Clark
 Forever, Darling (1956) - Dr. Edward R. Winter
 The Girl Can't Help It (1956) - Wheeler
 Kronos (1957) - Dr. Hubbell Eliot
 Ten North Frederick (1958) - Paul Donaldson
 Youngblood Hawke (1964) - Georges Peydal (final film role)

Selected television

References

External links

 
 
 
 

1905 births
1964 deaths
American male film actors
American male radio actors
American male television actors
Male actors from New York City
American male stage actors
20th-century American male actors